Hainaut (also , , ;  ;), historically also known as Heynowes in English, is a province of Wallonia and Belgium.

To its south lies the French department of Nord, while within Belgium it borders (clockwise from the North) on the Flemish provinces of West Flanders, East Flanders, Flemish Brabant and the Walloon provinces of Walloon Brabant and Namur.

Its capital is Mons (Dutch Bergen) and the most populous city is Charleroi, the province's urban, economic and cultural hub, the financial capital of Hainaut and the fifth largest city in the country by population. Another remarkable city is Tournai (Dutch Doornik) on the Scheldt river, one of the oldest cities of Belgium and the first capital of the Frankish Empire.

Hainaut province exists of a wavy landscape, except for the very southern part, the so-called Boot of Hainaut, which is quite hilly and belongs to the Ardennes and its foothills Fagne and the Condroz.

The village of L'Escaillère in the utmost southeastern corner is with an altitude of 365 metres the highest point of the province.

In the Boot of Hainaut on the border of Namur province the artificial five Eau d'Heure lakes are situated, the largest lake area of Belgium.

A well-known region is the Borinage, the old coal mining region around the city of Mons. Also well-known is the Pays des Collines (English Land of the Hills), a low hilly area forming one natural region with the Flemish Ardennes in the East Flanders province.

Language 
Picard is spoken in the western and centre parts of the province, while in the eastern part a mixture of Walloon and Picard is spoken (Wallo-Picard).

Some Flemish and Brabantic is spoken in the municipalities bordering the Flemish region.

History

The province derives from the French Revolutionary Jemmape department, formed in 1795 from part of the medieval County of Hainaut, the small territory of Tournai and the Tournaisis, a part of the county of Namur (Charleroi), and also a small part of the Prince-Bishopric of Liège (Thuin). (A large part of the historical county of Hainaut is now within France and sometimes referred to as French Hainaut.)

Subdivisions 
Hainaut province is divided into 7 administrative districts (arrondissements), subdivided into a total of 69 municipalities.

Arrondissements

Municipalities

Governors

Economy 
The Gross domestic product (GDP) of the province was 34.2 billion € in 2018, accounting for 7.4% of Belgium's economic output. GDP per capita adjusted for purchasing power was 22,500 € or 75% of the EU27 average in the same year. Hainaut is the province with the second lowest GDP per capita.

Miscellaneous
The patron saint of the province Hainaut is Saint Waltrude.

References

External links 

Official web site of the Hainaut province (available in French)
Official gateway to the Hainaut (available in French and Dutch )
The Chamber of Commerce and Industry of Hainaut (available in French and English)
Euro Info Centre Hainaut (available in French)
Walloon Settlers Monument

 
Provinces of Wallonia